Black Ticket Day is the sixth solo album by Australian guitarist and songwriter Ed Kuepper, recorded in 1992 and released on the Hot label.

Reception
The album spent two weeks in the Australian charts in 1992, peaking at number 45. Black Ticket Day was awarded an ARIA for the Best Independent Release and was a nominee for Best Album at the 1993 ARIA Music Awards.

The Allmusic review by Roch Parisien awarded the album 2½ stars and states: "Even at his most gorgeously melodic, there's always a dark, mournful tinge to Kuepper's work. His ability to combine beauty with sadness and basic pop structures with extended improvisation can be mesmerizing."

Track listing
All compositions by Ed Kuepper except as indicated
 "It's Lunacy" – 3:56
 "Blind Girl Stripper" – 9:02
 "Real Wild Life" – 3:52
 "All My Ideas Run to Crime" – 5:46
 "Black Ticket Day" – 4:42
 "Helps Me Understand" – 5:42
 "There's Nothing Natural" – 3:49
 "Walked Thin Wires" – 6:39
Recorded at Electric Avenue Studio, Rozelle, Sydney, Australia

Charts

Personnel
Ed Kuepper – vocals, guitar
Mark Dawson – drums, percussion
Sir Alfonso – bass, string arrangements
Peter Bull – piano, organ
Tim Hopkins – saxophone
Cameron Lundy – string bass
Paula Punch – vocals
The Hub String Quartet (track 2)

References

1992 albums
ARIA Award-winning albums
Ed Kuepper albums
Hot Records albums